Piret Niglas (born 5 April 1968) is an Estonian cross-country skier. She competed at the 1992, 1994 and the 2002 Winter Olympics.

Cross-country skiing results
All results are sourced from the International Ski Federation (FIS).

Olympic Games

World Championships

a.  Cancelled due to extremely cold weather.

World Cup

Season standings

References

External links
 

1968 births
Living people
Estonian female cross-country skiers
Olympic cross-country skiers of Estonia
Cross-country skiers at the 1992 Winter Olympics
Cross-country skiers at the 1994 Winter Olympics
Cross-country skiers at the 2002 Winter Olympics
Sportspeople from Kohtla-Järve
20th-century Estonian women
21st-century Estonian women